Fábio Henrique Lima (born 5 February 1981) is a Brazilian footballer who plays for Linense.

Biography
Born in Olímpia, São Paulo state, Lima left for CSKA Sofia in his early career. He then returned to São Paulo state for Juventus (SP), Barueri, Inter de Limeira, XV de Jaú, São Bento and América (SP).

In March 2008, he left for Campeonato Alagoano club CSA and in mid-2008 left for Romanian Liga I club Gloria Buzău.

In December 2008, he returned to CSA and signed a contract until the end of 2009 Campeonato Alagoano. In June, he extended his contract until the end of 2009 Campeonato Brasileiro Série D.

In December 2009 he left for Linense of 2010 Campeonato Paulista Série A2. After winning the champion and promoted back to São Paulo state first level, he extended his contract with club until the end of 2011 Campeonato Paulista.

On 27 December 2010 he signed a 1-year contract with CSA.

References

External links
Profile at football-lineups.com

 Linense Profile 
 CBF 
 Futpedia Profile 
 

Brazilian footballers
Brazilian expatriate footballers
FC Gloria Buzău players
Liga I players
Expatriate footballers in Romania
Association football central defenders
Footballers from São Paulo (state)
1989 births
Living people